Enfield is a surname.

People with this surname
 Andy Enfield (born 1969), American basketball coach 
 Edward Enfield (1929–2019), English journalist, father of Harry Enfield
 Harry Enfield (born 1961), British comedian 
 Michael Enfield (born 1983), American soccer player
 Cy Endfield (1914–1995), American director
 William Enfield (1741–1797), British minister, author, translator

See also
 Enfield (disambiguation)